The Ontario Tankard is the Southern Ontario provincial championship for men's curling. The winner represents Team Ontario at the Tim Hortons Brier. The tournament is overseen by CurlON (formerly the Ontario Curling Association).

Northern Ontario has its own provincial championship, known as the Northern Ontario Men's Provincial Curling Championship.

This championship is not to be confused with the Silver Tankard, historically also known as the Ontario Tankard (and until 1937 a Brier qualifier).

Qualification
Since 2017, the qualification has varied from year to year:
2017: 10 teams total (Top two southern Ontario teams in the CTRS standings; Six teams from two regional qualifiers; Two teams from a challenge round). 
2018: 12 teams total (Top two CTRS ranked teams; Six teams from two regional qualifiers; Three teams from a challenge round; And the Colts champion team).
2019: 10 teams total (Top three CTRS ranked teams; Five teams from three cash spiels; Two teams from an open qualifier).
2020: 9 teams total (Top three CTRS ranked teams; Four teams from two cash spiels; Two teams from an open qualifier).
2022: Originally 8 teams (Top two CTRS ranked teams; Top Trillium Tour series team; Two teams from a cash spiel; three from an open qualifier.) The open qualifier was cancelled due to the COVID-19 pandemic, so the top seven CTRS teams who had signed up for the qualifier were invited, expanding the number of entries in the tankard to 12.
2023: 12 teams total (Top 2 "Grand Slam series" teams; Top 2 "Trillium Tour '1,000' Series" teams; Top 3 "Trillium Tour '500' Series" teams; Top "Trillium Tour '250' Series (Under-25) team; Four teams from an open qualifier).

Between 1972 and 2016, the event usually had 10 teams: Four teams from each of the four OCA regions, and one winner each from an eastern and western challenge round. When Ontario won the previous Brier, that team would be added to the field for the following season. In 1999, when Ontario had not only won the previous Brier, but an Ontario team also won the 1997 Canadian Olympic Curling Trials, the field was expanded to 12 teams, giving them an automatic berth.

Format
The format of the Tankard has differed each year since 2018:
2018: Triple knockout followed by a four team page playoff.
2019: Round robin followed by a four team page playoff.
2020: Round robin followed by a three-team playoff.
2022: Triple knockout followed by a four team page playoff.
2022: Round robin within two pools of six, followed by a four team championship round, followed by a three team playoff.

From 1972 to 1981, the tournament was a strict round robin affair, with the team with the best record being crowned champion (a tiebreaker would be held if necessary). From 1981 to 2000, the tournament consisted of a round robin followed by a three team playoff. In 2001, the playoff was replaced with a four team page playoff.

Former Names
Ontario Silver Tankard: 1927-1931 
1932: Round robin playoff between the winners of the Ontario Tankard, Canada Life Trophy and the Toronto Bonspiel.
1933: Winner was decided between a playoff between the winners of the Ontario Tankard and the Toronto Bonspiel.
Ontario Silver Tankard: 1934-1937
British Consols: 1938-1979
Labatt Tankard: 1980-1985
Blue Light Tankard: 1986-1994
Labatt Tankard: 1995
Nokia Cup: 1996-2003
Ontario Men's Curling Championship: 2004 
Kia Cup: 2005-2006
TSC Stores Tankard: 2007-2009
Ontario Men's Curling Championship: 2010
The Dominion Tankard: 2011-2013
Travelers Tankard: 2014
Recharge with Milk Tankard: 2015-2017
Dairy Farmers of Ontario Tankard: 2018
Ontario Curling Championships: 2019–2020
Port Elgin Chrysler Ontario Tankard: 2022–23

Brier representatives
Listed below are the list of Ontario's representatives at the Brier that year. Brier champions indicated in bold. From 1927 to 1931, Toronto had a separate entry at the Brier.

1927–1931
From 1927 to 1931, teams representing Ontario at the Brier were selected from the winning club at the Ontario Silver Tankard, a double rink event which has taken place since 1875.

1932–1980
There was no Brier from 1943 to 1945 due to World War II. Listed here for those years are the winners of the British Consols, the usual Brier qualifying event.

1981–present
A playoff was added to the event in 1981. The 2021 Tankard was cancelled due to the COVID-19 pandemic in Ontario.

References
List of Champions - Ontario Curling Association

External links

 
Recurring sporting events established in 1927
1927 establishments in Ontario